The Last Mountain is a 2021 mountain film co-produced by the BBC about the death of Tom Ballard on Nanga Parbat. The film follows the film Alison's Last Mountain (1996) about the death of his mother Alison Hargreaves twenty four years earlier on her descent from her second unaided summit of K2.

References

External links

Mountaineering films